Softball competitions at the 2019 Pan American Games in Lima, Peru are scheduled to be held from July 25 to August 10. The venue for the competition is the softball stadium located at the Villa María del Triunfo cluster. A total of six men's and six women's teams (each consisting up to 15 athletes) competed in each tournament. This means a total of 180 athletes are scheduled to compete.

Competition schedule
The following is the competition schedule for the softball competitions:

Medalists

Participating nations
A total of 8 countries qualified softball teams.

Qualification
A total of six men's teams and six women's team will qualify to compete at the games in each tournament. The host nation (Peru) qualified in each tournament, along with the top five teams at the 2017 Pan American Championships in each event.

Men

Canada, which has won every gold medal in this event at the Pan American Games, failed to qualify for the tournament.

Women

See also
 Softball at the 2020 Summer Olympics

References

External links
Results book

 
softball
softball
2019 in softball
International softball competitions hosted by Peru